The 2017 PSL season was the fifth season of the Philippine Super Liga (PSL).

Indoor volleyball

Invitational Cup

Classification round (March 15 to 23, 2017):

|}

Final round 6th to 4th place (March 30 to April 01, 2017):

|}

Final round (March 30 to April 01, 2017):

|}

Final standings:

Awards:

All-Filipino Conference

Preliminary round (June 6-27, 2017):
Pool A:

|}
Pool B:

|}

Pool C:

|}
Pool D:

|}

Playoffs:

Final standings:

Awards:

Grand Prix Conference

Playoffs:

Final standing:

Awards:

Beach volleyball

Women's division

Playoffs:

Final standing:

Men's division

Playoffs:

Final standings:

International competitions

2017 AVC Asian Women's Club Championship

On May 9, 2017, the PSL announced that the PSL All-Stars (playing as "Rebisco-PSL Manila") would represent the Philippines in the 2017 Asian Women’s Club Volleyball Championship held in Ust-Kamenogorsk, Kazakhstan. Originally, the Philippines was to be represented by the 2016 PSL Grand Prix Conference champions, the Foton Tornadoes, which begged off due to its depleted lineup.

Rebisco-PSL Manila finished at last place (8th).

2017 Macau Invitational women's volleyball tournament
On July 14, 2017, a day after the Petron Blaze Spikers won the 2017 All-Filipino conference, PSL president Tats Suzara announced that Petron will play in the 2017 Macau Invitational Women’s Volleyball Tournament to be held on September 23 to 25, 2017 in Macau.

Brand ambassador
 Abigail Maraño

Broadcast partners
 TV5, AksyonTV, Sports5.ph

References

Philippine Super Liga
PSL
PSL